Robert Dennison (14 December 1879 – 10 November 1951) was a British Labour Party politician.

Born in Glasgow, Dennison attended a Science School in the city.   In 1912, he was elected to Stockton-on-Tees Town Council, for the Labour Party, serving until 1917.  Also in 1912, he began working full-time for a trade union, a predecessor of the Iron and Steel Trades Confederation.

Dennison stood unsuccessfully in Walsall at the 1922 UK general election, and in Cleveland at the 1923 UK general election.  He was finally elected  for Birmingham King's Norton at the 1924 general election, with a small majority of 133 votes.

Dennison lost his seat to Lionel Beaumont-Thomas, a Conservative, at the 1929 general election, by 491 votes.  He subsequently moved to New Barnet, where he was elected to the Urban District Council.  He was also appointed as a magistrate for both Hertfordshire and Middlesex.

References

1879 births
1951 deaths
Councillors in County Durham
Councillors in Hertfordshire
Iron and Steel Trades Confederation-sponsored MPs
Politicians from Glasgow
Labour Party (UK) councillors
Labour Party (UK) MPs for English constituencies
UK MPs 1924–1929